The 1954 Nebraska Cornhuskers football team was the representative of the University of Nebraska and member of the Big 7 Conference in the 1954 college football season. The team was coached by Bill Glassford and played their home games at Memorial Stadium in Lincoln, Nebraska.

Before the season
At the conclusion of the previous season, coach Glassford's third losing season in five years, sentiment was strong for a change in leadership.  However, while Glassford survived the strife, Athletic Director George Clark did resign his position.  Clark had previously led the Nebraska football team, in 1945 and then again in 1948, before ascending to the position of Athletic Director.  Another former Nebraska football coach, Adolph J. Lewandowski (1943–1944), was named as acting AD in his stead.  Lewandowski eventually helped select Bill Orwig as the new permanent Athletic Director, a position he would hold through 1960.  Glassford was kept on under Orwig, but the pressure was building for the Nebraska football program to regain its footing and build consistency going forward.

Schedule

Roster

Starters

Coaching staff

Game summaries

Minnesota

Opening against powerhouse rival Minnesota was a tall order to ask of the football team.  Using the Split T Formation installed during the offseason, the Cornhuskers managed a single touchdown to avoid the shutout in Minneapolis, but the Golden Gophers had little trouble adding to their lead in the series, moving up to 28-5-2 against Nebraska to date.

Iowa State

The Cornhuskers bounced back from the season opener by trouncing the Cyclones in Lincoln, scoring often and allowing some reserve players to get some on-field time for experience.  Nebraska didn't back off as the game progressed, and scored again with less than two minutes remaining.  The victory extended the Cornhusker winning streak over Iowa State to nine games, as Nebraska improved to 39-8-1 in the series.

Kansas State

Year in and year out in recent times, Kansas State could be counted on as an automatic win for the Nebraska squad, until last year.  In 1953, the Wildcats snapped their ten-game losing streak against the Cornhuskers, and so were not intimidated by the Nebraska squad upon meeting them in Lincoln.  The Wildcats put on a defensive show, allowing the Cornhuskers only a field goal as the day wore on.  With Nebraska clinging to a 3-0 lead and less than five minutes to play, the Cornhusker defense allowed a Wildcat touchdown, and Kansas State took away their sixth win in the 38-game series.

Oregon State

Smarting from allowing Kansas State another win, the Cornhuskers lit into underdog Oregon State, ensuring the results would come out as expected for the week.  Nebraska was up by three touchdowns before the Beavers were able to even muster a single-touchdown response, and the win put the Cornhuskers up to 6-2 in the series to date.

Colorado

It was not yet clear what path the 1954 Cornhuskers were going to take, having started out 2-2 on the season.  The Colorado game was likely to set the tone for the rest of the year, as Nebraska had to face the Buffaloes in Boulder.  Colorado entered the game with a #11 ranking from the AP Poll, led the nation in rushing offense, and held the #10 position in total defense.  The first half was a fistfight that sent both teams off the field for the break tied at 6-6, but after that it was all Nebraska.  The nation's leading rushing team was outrushed by the Cornhuskers 280 to 231, and gave up a total of 380 yards on the day as Nebraska snapped Colorado's nine-game winning streak.  It was the first time Nebraska had recorded a victory at Folsom Field.  Colorado fell to 5-8 in the overall series.

Missouri

Bolstered by the victory in Boulder, but perhaps offended by the lack of attention given to them by the AP Poll after having knocked off the nation's #11 team on the road, Nebraska hosted a favored Missouri team in Lincoln.  The first half was again a close affair, as the Cornhuskers held a mere 6-point lead at the half, but quickly scored two more times after the break to open the game up.  Missouri did not give up, however, drawing within six points again.  The Tigers had a chance to tie or go  for the win when Nebraska was forced to punt inside the final minute.  Nebraska prevailed when the punt returner was hit by two blockers and fumbled the ball, ending the game one play later.  The win moved Nebraska to 26-18-2 over Missouri all time, snapped Missouri's three-game edge over the Cornhuskers, and returned the Victory Bell to Lincoln.

Kansas

Following the Missouri win, the AP Poll recognized Nebraska by moving them to a shared #20 ranking entering this game, the first time the Cornhuskers had been ranked since the beginning of 1951.  Kansas attempted to hold the game close, and kept with seven points well into the third quarter, but the Cornhusker machine rolled up 416 yards on the day and pulled away to secure their 4th win in league play.  The victory improved the Cornhuskers to 44-13-3 over the Jayhawks all time.  Despite the win, Nebraska fell back out of the AP Poll.

Pittsburgh

Riding a wave of success, Nebraska played host to rival Pittsburgh for the annual homecoming match up.  The Panthers were favored, but a savage battle on the field yielded no points for either team by the half as the Cornhuskers battled for national respect.  Despite the effort, Pittsburgh's halftime adjustments broke through the Nebraska defense for two scores in the third quarter.  A single Cornhusker reply was all the home team could muster in reply as the Panthers scored a third time near the end of the game.  It was Nebraska's third straight loss in the series as they slipped to 3-13-3 against Pittsburgh to date.

Oklahoma

Perennial league champion Oklahoma brought Nebraska to Norman and quickly demolished the stunned Cornhuskers to close out the Big 7 conference schedule.  It seemed like Nebraska might have still had a chance despite their 7-21 deficit at halftime, but the Sooners had little difficulty piling on the points afterward.  Oklahoma's 55 points against the Cornhuskers were the most allowed in the program's history, and the scoring margin of 48 points was the worst since  a 0-48 defeat, also handed down by the Sooners, in 1949.  Oklahoma's record streak of wins over Nebraska was extended to 12, and Nebraska's series edge narrowed to a single-game margin of 16-15-3.  Oklahoma went on to finish the season 10-0 and ranked #3 in the AP Poll.  Under the relatively recent no-repeat bowl appearance rule implemented by the Big 7, Oklahoma was not permitted to represent the league in the Orange Bowl, and as the second-place Big 7 team, Nebraska instead got the nod to play in Miami on January 1.

Hawaii

The Cornhuskers were treated to a late season game against Hawaii, the first meeting of these teams, in Honolulu.  The Cornhuskers quickly forgot their troubles against Oklahoma by piling 50 unanswered points on the hapless Rainbows for a dominating shutout victory to close the regular season.  The defeat of Hawaii was Nebraska's most prolific since an identical 50-0 downing of Wyoming back in the 1934 season opener twenty years prior.

Duke

Nebraska was invited to the Orange Bowl for the first time in program history, and this game was the 11th in Nebraska's first-ever 11-game season as well as Nebraska's second-ever bowl game.  The Cornhuskers had not played a postseason game since meeting Stanford in the 1941 Rose Bowl, while Duke had not seen a postseason game for ten years.  Several opinion pieces of the time displayed disdain for the Big 7's no-repeat bowl rule, and that Oklahoma was not permitted to participate as Big 7 champion.  Nebraska nonetheless attempted to make a game of it, coming back from a 0-14 halftime deficit to pull within 7, but the Blue Devils overwhelmed and dominated the day in the first and only meeting of these teams.  Nebraska was outyarded 370-110, and 288-84 on the ground, to the dismay of a Nebraska team known for its ground attack.  The entire Duke roster in attendance was able to get playing time, and Nebraska was unable to find success even against the Blue Devil reserves.  Except for the 1941 Rose Bowl, it was the largest crowd that the Cornhuskers had ever played in front of, though as Duke began to roll and went up 27-7, many in the stands began to leave early.  Said coach Glassford after the game: "I knew we'd have to play our best to stand a chance of beating Duke, but we came up with a stinking performance and got spanked."

After the season
Although the season did not exactly end on a high note, the winning record and first bowl game appearance since 1941 was more than enough to allow coach Glassford to retain his position and quiet the voices hoping for him to be replaced.  For the sixth season in a row since taking over at Nebraska, Glassford had alternated winning and losing seasons, so even with the runner-up league finish and post season appearance, there was still no form of confidence that the winning performance could be maintained.  Glassford's second place Big 7 record of 4-2 was enough to push his overall conference record back to the winning side, at 18-17-1 (.514), though his overall record was still lagging at 26-30-3 (.466).  Nebraska's program all-time league percentage improved slightly to 138-54-12 (.706), while the overall record slipped to 342-178-34 (.648).

Future NFL and other professional league players
 Charley Bryant, 1955 24th-round pick of the Green Bay Packers
 Don Glantz, 1955 5th-round pick of the Washington Redskins
 Bob Smith, 1955 15th-round pick of the Cleveland Browns
Laverne Torczon, 1957 18th-round pick of the Cleveland Browns

References

Nebraska
Nebraska Cornhuskers football seasons
Nebraska Cornhuskers football